The Cypress Street Viaduct, often referred to as the Cypress Structure or the Cypress Freeway, was a 1.6-mile-long (2.5 km), raised two-deck, multi-lane (four lanes per tier) freeway constructed of reinforced concrete that was originally part of the Nimitz Freeway (State Route 17, and later, Interstate 880) in Oakland, California.

It replaced an earlier single-deck viaduct constructed in the 1930s as one of the approaches to the San Francisco–Oakland Bay Bridge. It was located along Cypress Street between 7th Street and Interstate 80 in the West Oakland neighborhood.

It officially opened to traffic on June 11, 1957, and was in use until October 17, 1989. At approximately 5:04 p.m. that day, a magnitude 6.9 earthquake struck the Bay Area, resulting in a large portion of the freeway's upper deck collapsing onto the lower deck. The collapse killed 42 people and resulted in the subsequent demolition of the structure.

The Cypress Freeway Memorial Park is located in Oakland, at 14th Street and Mandela Parkway.

Construction
The double-decked viaduct was initially designed in 1949 by the City of Oakland as a way to ease traffic on local streets leading to the Bay Bridge, such as Cypress Street (which was California State Route 17 at the time).  The route was partially chosen to displace perceived slums in West Oakland.

The southernmost portion of the Cypress Street viaduct, which was designed as a central off ramp structure exiting at Market Street between Fifth and Sixth Streets to the Eighth Street/Seventh Street on/off ramps, was the first phase of the overall project completed in October 1955, by contractors Frederickson and Watson at a cost of $1.7 million. Construction on the second phase of the project, the double-decked viaduct portion (which started from Adeline Street in the south to the MacArthur Maze in the north), began in February 1956 by contractors Grove, Wilson, Shepard and Kruge at a cost of $8.3 million, bringing the total cost of the viaduct project to $10 million. It was California's first double-decked freeway when it officially opened to traffic on June 11, 1957.

Loma Prieta earthquake
On October 17, 1989, the portion of the structure from 16th Street north all the way to the MacArthur Maze collapsed during the 1989 Loma Prieta earthquake, due to ground movement and structural flaws.

When in use, the upper deck was used by southbound traffic, and the lower deck was used by northbound traffic. Some sections of the Cypress Street Viaduct were largely supported by two columns on either side, but some sections were only supported beneath by a single supporting column. The design was unable to survive the earthquake because the upper portions of the exterior columns were not tied by reinforcing to the lower columns, and the columns were not sufficiently ringed to prevent bursting (similar to  Hanshin Expressway in Kobe, Japan). At the time of its design, such structures were not analyzed as a whole, and it appears that large structure motion contributed to the collapse. It was built on filled land on top of bay clay; filled land is highly susceptible to soil settlement during an earthquake, and bay clay exhibits larger ground motion. A little bit of earthquake reinforcement was added to the Cypress Street Viaduct in 1977.

After the earthquake stopped (with no aftershock), local residents and workers began crawling into and climbing upon the shattered structure with the goal of rescuing those left alive. Many were saved, some only by amputation of trapped limbs. The collapse of the upper tier onto the lower tier resulted in 42 fatalities—while this represented two-thirds of the total quake death toll of 63, it was a magnitude lower than initially feared; with San Francisco and Oakland in the World Series, many would-be commuters in both cities had left work early or stayed late to watch the upcoming Game 3, and as a result traffic on the viaduct was far lighter at the time of the quake than it normally would have been.

After the viaduct was torn down, Cypress Street was renamed Mandela Parkway, in honor of Nelson Mandela, and a landscaped median strip was planted where the viaduct once stood. Before reconstruction occurred, the viaduct ended at the 7th Street exit on the southern end, with the two roadways going over 7th Street, while the southbound exit off the MacArthur Maze onto Cypress Street at 32nd Street remained open to local traffic on the northern end.

Reconstruction around West Oakland

In 1997, the Nimitz Freeway was rerouted to loop around the area using a largely ground-level design with more conventional single-level viaduct. The space was mainly taken from a railroad yard which was relocated. The exit at 8th Street was eliminated, a southbound exit near 7th and Union Street and a single northbound and southbound exit at 7th Street, near the Port of Oakland was constructed also providing access via Frontage Road to West Grand Avenue and the Oakland Army Base on Maritime Street, before a viaduct-type interchange splitting traffic to the Bay Bridge via Grand Avenue and also northbound to the Eastshore Freeway. This also realigned the ramp from I-80 west to I-580 east/I-880 south which fully completed the Cypress Freeway Realignment in 2001.

During construction of the new section of the Nimitz Freeway, a team of archaeologists made many interesting discoveries about the people who lived in West Oakland in the 19th century.

Due to cost overruns, the costs of the replacement freeway doubled from initial estimates of $650 million to $1.2 billion ($250 million per mile) making the five-mile freeway replacement the most expensive project in the state's history at the time. (It would be subsequently overshadowed by the northbound addition of the Benicia–Martinez Bridge and the Eastern span replacement of the San Francisco–Oakland Bay Bridge.)   The cost overruns were mainly due to the opposition to replacing the highway on the site of the one partially destroyed in 1989, therefore requiring the purchase of land and property from Southern Pacific Railroad and Amtrak (moving part of the rail yard, which in turn caused the earthquake-damaged 16th Street Amtrak Station to be closed and replaced with two Amtrak stations in Jack London Square and Emeryville), the United States Postal Service (having to replace a parking lot with a parking garage), and the U.S. Army (the new route went through the Oakland Army Base), as well as replacing BART support beams.

Exit list

Gallery

Similar structures damaged by earthquakes
 Alaskan Way Viaduct
 Central Freeway
 Embarcadero Freeway
 Hanshin Expressway

See also

Interstate 280 (California) – the only remaining similar freeway in the Bay Area.

References

External links

 Miracle on Interstate 880 (1993), TV movie fictionalization and re-enactment of events at the Cypress Structure.
  Loma Prieta Earthquake, ca. 1989 (03/2003 – ). National Archives and Records Administration – ARC Identifier 951729 / Local Identifier 311-NETC-39 – Department of Homeland Security. Federal Emergency Management Agency. National Emergency Training Center.
 Construction of the Cypress Viaduct (part 1 of 5) (1950s), Caltrans video showing the progress of construction and engineering methods used.

Bridge disasters caused by earthquakes
Bridges in Alameda County, California
Buildings and structures in Oakland, California
Viaducts in the United States
Transportation disasters in California
1989 in California
1989 disasters in the United States
Bridge disasters in the United States
History of Oakland, California
Bridges on the Interstate Highway System
Demolished bridges in the United States
Demolished highways in the United States
Former buildings and structures in California
Former road bridges in the United States
Interstate 80
Named freeways in California
Concrete bridges in California
Road bridges in California
San Francisco Bay Area freeways
Transportation in Oakland, California
20th century in Oakland, California
2010s in Oakland
1957 establishments in California
1989 disestablishments in California